Durio acutifolius is a species of durian tree in the family Malvaceae. It is endemic to Borneo.

References 

Acutifolius
Endemic flora of Borneo
Trees of Borneo
Vulnerable flora of Asia
Taxonomy articles created by Polbot